Dana Stevens may refer to:

 Dana Stevens (critic), movie critic at Slate magazine
 Dana Stevens (screenwriter), screenwriter and television writer/producer
 Dana Stevens (character), a fictional trans woman featured in Chris Bohjalian's novel Trans-Sister Radio

See also
 Dayna Stephens